"The Emperor's New Clothes" is a literary folktale written by Danish author Hans Christian Andersen, about a vain emperor who gets exposed before his subjects. The tale has been translated into over 100 languages.

"The Emperor's New Clothes" was first published with "The Little Mermaid" in Copenhagen, by C. A. Reitzel, on 7 April 1837, as the third and final installment of Andersen's Fairy Tales Told for Children. The tale has been adapted to various media, and the story's title, the phrase "the Emperor has no clothes", and variations thereof have been adopted for use in numerous other works and as idioms.

Plot
Two swindlers arrive at the capital city of an emperor who spends lavishly on clothing at the expense of state matters. Posing as weavers, they offer to supply him with magnificent clothes that are invisible to those who are stupid or incompetent. The
emperor hires them, and they set up looms and go to work. A succession of officials, and then the emperor himself, visit them to check their progress. Each sees that the looms are empty but pretends otherwise to avoid being thought a fool. 

Finally, the weavers report that the emperor's suit is finished. They mime dressing him and he sets off in a procession before the whole city. The townsfolk uncomfortably go along with the pretense, not wanting to appear inept or stupid, until a child blurts out that the emperor is wearing nothing at all. The people then realize that everyone has been fooled. Although startled, the emperor continues the procession, walking more proudly than ever.

Sources
Andersen did not know the Spanish original but read the tale in a German translation titled . In the source tale, a king is hoodwinked by weavers who claim to make a suit of clothes invisible to any man not the son of his presumed father; whereas Andersen altered the source tale to direct the focus on courtly pride and intellectual vanity rather than adulterous paternity.

There is also an Indian version of the story, which appears in the Līlāvatīsāra by Jinaratna (1283), a summary of a now-lost anthology of fables, the Nirvāṇalīlāvatī by Jineśvara (1052). The dishonest merchant Dhana from Hastināpura swindles the King of Śrāvastī by offering to weave a supernatural garment that cannot be seen or touched by any person of illegitimate birth. When the king is supposedly wearing the garment, his whole court pretends to admire it. The king is then paraded about his city to show off the garment; when the common folk ask him if he has become a naked ascetic, he realizes the deception, but the swindler has already fled.

Composition
Andersen's manuscript was at the printer's when he was suddenly inspired to change the original climax of the tale from the emperor's subjects admiring his invisible clothes to that of the child's cry.  There are many unconfirmed theories about why he made this change.  Most scholars agree that from his earliest years in Copenhagen, Andersen presented himself to the Danish bourgeoisie as the naïvely precocious child not usually admitted to the adult salon.  "The Emperor's New Clothes" became his exposé of the hypocrisy and snobbery he found there when he finally gained admission.

Andersen's decision to change the ending may have occurred after he read the manuscript tale to a child, or its inspiration may have been one of Andersen's own childhood incidents which was similar to that in the tale: he once recalled standing in a crowd with his mother, waiting to see King Frederick VI, and when the king made his appearance, Andersen cried out, "Oh, he's nothing more than a human being!"  His mother then tried to silence him saying, "Have you gone mad, child?"  Whatever the reason, Andersen thought the change would prove more satirical.

Publication

"The Emperor's New Clothes" was first published with "The Little Mermaid" on 7 April 1837, by C.A. Reitzel in Copenhagen, as the third and final installment of the first collection of Andersen's Fairy Tales Told for Children.  The first two booklets of the collection were published in May and December 1835, and met with little critical enthusiasm.  Andersen waited a year before publishing the third installment of the collection.

Traditional Danish tales, as well as German and French folktales, were regarded as a form of exotica in nineteenth century Denmark and were read aloud to select gatherings by celebrated actors of the day. Andersen's tales eventually became a part of the repertoire, and readings of "The Emperor's New Clothes" became a specialty of and a big hit for the popular Danish actor Ludvig Phister.

On 1 July 1844, the Hereditary Grand Duke Carl Alexander held a literary soiree at Ettersburg in honor of Andersen. Tired by speaking various foreign languages and on the verge of vomiting after days of feasting, the author managed to control his body and read aloud "The Princess and the Pea", "Little Ida's Flowers", and "The Emperor's New Clothes".

Commentaries
Jack Zipes, in Hans Christian Andersen: The Misunderstood Storyteller, suggests that seeing is presented in the tale as the courage of one's convictions; Zipes believes this is the reason the story is popular with children. Sight becomes insight, which, in turn, prompts action.

Alison Prince, author of Hans Christian Andersen: The Fan Dancer, claims that Andersen received a gift of a ruby and diamond ring from the king after publications of "The Emperor's New Clothes" and "The Swineherd"—tales in which Andersen voices a satirical disrespect for the court. Prince suggests the ring was an attempt to curb Andersen's sudden bent for political satire by bringing him into the royal fold. She points out that after "The Swineherd", he never again wrote a tale colored with political satire, but, within months of the gift, began composing "The Ugly Duckling", a tale about a bird born in a henyard who, after a lifetime of misery, matures into a swan, "one of those royal birds". 

In Hans Christian Andersen: The Life of a Storyteller, biographer Jackie Wullschlager points out that Andersen was not only a successful adapter of existing lore and literary material, such as the Spanish source tale for "The Emperor's New Clothes", but was equally competent at creating new material that entered the human collective consciousness with the same mythic power as ancient, anonymous lore.

Hollis Robbins, in "The Emperor's New Critique" (2003), argues that the tale is itself so transparent "that there has been little need for critical scrutiny. Robbins argues that Andersen's tale "quite clearly rehearses four contemporary controversies: the institution of a meritocratic civil service, the valuation of labor, the expansion of democratic power, and the appraisal of art".  Robbins concludes that the story's appeal lies in its "seductive resolution" of the conflict by the truth-telling boy.

In The Annotated Hans Christian Andersen (2008), folk and fairy tale researcher Maria Tatar offers a scholarly investigation and analysis of the story, drawing on Robbins' political and sociological analysis of the tale.  Tatar points out that Robbins indicates the swindling weavers are simply insisting that "the value of their labor be recognized apart from its material embodiment" and notes that Robbins considers the ability of some in the tale to see the invisible cloth as "a successful enchantment".

Tatar observes that "The Emperor's New Clothes" is one of Andersen's best-known tales and one that has acquired an iconic status globally as it migrates across various cultures reshaping itself with each retelling in the manner of oral folktales.  Scholars have noted that the phrase "Emperor's new clothes" has become a standard metaphor for anything that smacks of pretentiousness, pomposity, social hypocrisy, collective denial, or hollow ostentatiousness.  Historically, the tale established Andersen's reputation as a children's author whose stories actually imparted lessons of value for his juvenile audience, and "romanticized" children by "investing them with the courage to challenge authority and to speak truth to power." 

With each successive description of the swindlers' wonderful cloth, it becomes more substantial, more palpable, and a thing of imaginative beauty for the reader even though it has no material existence. Its beauty, however, is obscured at the end of the tale with the obligatory moral message for children. Tatar is left wondering if the real value of the tale is the creation of the wonderful fabric in the reader's imagination or the tale's closing message of speaking truth no matter how humiliating to the recipient.

Naomi Wood of Kansas State University challenges Robbins' reading, arguing that before the World Trade Center attacks of 2001, "Robbins's argument might seem merely playful, anti-intuitive, and provocative."  Wood concludes: "Perhaps the truth of 'The Emperor's New Clothes' is not that the child's truth is mercifully free of adult corruption, but that it recognizes the terrifying possibility that whatever words we may use to clothe our fears, the fabric cannot protect us from them."

In 2017, Robbins returned to the tale to suggest that the courtiers who pretend not to see what they see are models of men in a workplace who claim not to see harassment.

Adaptations and cultural references

Various adaptations of the tale have appeared since its first publication.

Film and television
1919 Russian short film directed by Yuri Zhelyabuzhsky

In 1953, theatrical short titled The Emperor's New Clothes, produced by UPA

In 1961, Croatian film (80') directed by Ante Babaja, writer Božidar Violić (see IMDB).

In the 1965 Doctor Who serial The Romans, the Doctor uses the story as inspiration to avoid his disguise as a lyre player being discovered. He later claims to have given Andersen the original idea for the story in the first place.

In 1970, Patrick Wymark appeared as the Emperor in Hans Christian Andersen, an Australian musical/comedy television special highlighting three of Andersen's most famous stories. It was broadcast five weeks after Wymark's untimely death in Melbourne.

In 1972, Rankin/Bass Productions adapted the tale as the first and only musical episode of ABC series The Enchanted World of Danny Kaye, featuring Danny Kaye, Cyril Ritchard, Imogene Coca, Allen Swift, and Bob McFadden. The television special features eight songs with music by Maury Laws and lyrics by Jules Bass, and combines live action filmed in Aarhus, Denmark, animation, special effects, and the stop motion animation process "Animagic" made in Japan.

In 1985, Shelley Duvall's Faerie Tale Theatre adapted the fairy tale starring Dick Shawn as the Emperor while Alan Arkin and Art Carney starred as the con artists.

The 1987, Japanese war documentary film The Emperor's Naked Army Marches On, by director Kazuo Hara, centers on 62-year-old Kenzō Okuzaki, veteran of Japan's Second World War campaign in New Guinea, and follows him around as he searches out those responsible for the unexplained deaths of two soldiers in his old unit.

The Emperor's New Clothes, a 1987 musical comedy adaptation of the fairy tale starring Sid Caesar, part of the Cannon Movie Tales series

The Emperor's New Clothes (1991) animated film, by Burbank Animation Studios.

Muppet Classic Theater has an adaptation of the story with Fozzie as the emperor, and with Rizzo and two of his fellow rats as the swindlers.

In the 1997 television drama ...First Do No Harm, Lori (played by Meryl Streep) is shown reading this story to her young son Robbie (played by Seth Adkins).

An original video animation (OVA) episode of the anime franchise Bikini Warriors humorously adapts the tale, wherein the main characters are stripped nude by an unseen deity under the pretense that it has actually gifted them with a new, legendary bikini armor which only "idiots" are unable to see.

HBO Family aired an animated adaptation called The Emperor’s Newest Clothes in 2018.  Alan Alda narrated the tale and Jeff Daniels was the voice of the Emperor.

Other media
On 1 March 1957, Bing Crosby recorded a musical adaptation of the story for children which was issued as an album Never Be Afraid by Golden Records in 1957.

In 1968, on their Four Fairy Tales and Other Children's Stories" album, the Pickwick Players performed a version of this story that is actually a version of The King's New Clothes" from the film Hans Christian Andersen.  In this version, two swindlers trick the Emperor into buying a nonexistent suit, only for a boy to reveal the truth in the end.  There are several differences from the original Danny Kaye  version, most importantly a new verse ("This suit of clothes put all together is altogether / The most remarkable suit of clothes, that you've already said.  The shirt is white, the cape is ermine, the hose are blue,/ And the doublet is a lovely shade of red!"
To which the emperor replies "Green! Glorious Green!"  and the Court asks "How could we think it was red!"

In 1980, computer scientist C.A.R. Hoare used a parody tale, The Emperor's Old Clothes, to advocate simplification over embellishment, for clothing or computer programming languages.

In 1985, Jack Herer published the first edition of The Emperor Wears No Clothes, which uncovers the history of industrial hemp through civilization, culminating in a propaganda campaign in the U.S. in the early 20th century.  The book is now in its 11th edition.

In 1989, Roger Penrose parodied artificial intelligence as having no substance in his book The Emperor's New Mind.

Elton John uses the title of the story in the opening track of his 2001 album Songs from the West Coast.

Irish singer Sinead O'Connor included a song called "The Emperor's New Clothes" on her 1990 album I Do Not Want What I Haven't Got, which references failed relationships.

In 2011, Tony Namate, an award-winning Zimbabwean cartoonist, published a collection of political cartoons entitled The Emperor's New Clods. This collection features cartoons published in Zimbabwean newspapers between 1998 and 2005, highlighting some landmark moments in a troubled period of the country's history.

In 2014, the online game Final Fantasy XIV introduced a gear set prefixed The Emperor's New, which is composed of gear pieces (e.g. The Emperor's New Gloves) that do not have an in-game model, effectively displaying a character in underwear when the whole set is equipped. This followed requests from the player base to be able to hide a piece of equipment they do not want displayed, using the in-game glamour system that allows gear appearance alteration. The flavour text of the gear pieces is a tongue-in-cheek reference to the tale: "The most beautiful handwear you never have seen".

In 2016, Panic! At the Disco released a song titled "Emperor's New Clothes," which includes the lyrics "I'm taking back the crown. I'm all dressed up and naked."

In 2016, heavy metal act Megadeth released "The Emperor" on their 15th studio album, Dystopia, which won a Grammy.

In 2019, Radiohead´s leaked and then self-released MiniDiscs (Hacked) featured an incomplete song by the name "My New Clothes", in which the lyrics "The people stop and stare at the emperor" and "And even if it hurts to walk, and people laugh, I know who I am" were included.

In 2020, FINNEAS released a song titled "Where the Poison is", featuring the lyrics "I guess not everybody knows the emperor was never wearin' any clothes". The song is presented as a criticism of Donald Trump and his administration's handling of the COVID-19 pandemic in the United States.

Also in 2020, the expansion Greymoor for the MMORPG The Elder Scrolls Online included an altered version of the tale titled as "The Jarl's New Robes" in one of the books the player can read.

Use as an idiom
As an idiom, use of the story's title refers to something widely accepted as true or professed as being praiseworthy, due to an unwillingness of the general population to criticize it or be seen as going against popular opinion. The phrase "emperor's new clothes" has become an idiom about logical fallacies.  The story may be explained by pluralistic ignorance. 
The story is about a situation where "no one believes, but everyone believes that everyone else believes. Or alternatively, everyone is ignorant to whether the emperor has clothes on or not, but believes that everyone else is not ignorant."

See also

 Abilene paradox
 Asch conformity experiments
 The Courtier's Reply
 Elephant in the room
 The Emperor's New Groove
 Groupthink
 Mutual knowledge (logic)
 Polite fiction
 Pluralistic ignorance
 Spiral of silence
 Three men make a tiger
 Wishful thinking

References

Bibliography

External links

 "Keiserens nye Klæder". Original Danish text
 "Keiserens nye Klæder". Manuscript from the Odense City Museum
 "The Emperor's New Clothes". English translation by Jean Hersholt
 "The Emperor's New Clothes". Audio rendition by Sir Michael Redgrave
 

Danish fairy tales
1837 short stories
Short stories by Hans Christian Andersen
Idioms
Fictional emperors and empresses
Fictional tailors
Literary characters introduced in 1837
Male characters in literature
Male characters in fairy tales